The 1973 Michigan State Spartans football team represented Michigan State University in the 1973 Big Ten Conference football season. In their first season under head coach Denny Stolz, the Spartans compiled a 5–6 overall record (4–4 against Big Ten opponents) and finished in a tie for fourth place in the Big Ten Conference.

Defensive Bill Simpson was the only Spartan to be selected by either the Associated Press (AP) or the United Press International (UPI) as a first-team player on the 1973 All-Big Ten Conference football team. Simpson received first-team honors from the UPI and second-team honors from the AP. Other Spartans received second-team honors, including defensive tackle John Shinsky, linebackers Ray Nester and Terence McClowry, and defensive back Mark Niesen.

Schedule

Roster

Season summary

at Ohio State

References

Michigan State
Michigan State Spartans football seasons
Michigan State Spartans football